This is a list of all matches contested between the two prominent Tehran clubs Esteghlal and Persepolis, a fixture known as Tehran Derby.

Iranian League (Persian Gulf Pro League)

Iranian Cup (Hazfi Cup)

Iranian Super Cup

Tehran Tournaments (Tehran Province League & Tehran Super Cup)

Friendlies and Exhibitions

Summary of all matches

Notes

References 
 previous 93 derby matches (in Persian)
 تاریخچه کامل 91 دربی سرخابی‌ها
 همه گلزنان دربی

External links 

 The battle of Tehran, FIFA
 List of Tehran Derby matches (In Persian)

Football derbies in Iran
Persepolis F.C. matches
Esteghlal F.C. matches
Esteghlal F.C.
Persepolis F.C.